Eleftherios Mertakas (born March 16, 1985, in Paralimni) is a Cypriot football, who plays for Ayia Napa as a defender.

External links
 
 

Living people
1985 births
Cypriot footballers
Cyprus international footballers
Association football midfielders
Enosis Neon Paralimni FC players
AEK Larnaca FC players
Ayia Napa FC players
Cypriot First Division players
Cypriot Second Division players